Danta Whitaker (born March 14, 1964, in Atlanta, Georgia) was a former professional American football tight end. The New York Giants drafted him in the seventh round of the 1988 NFL Draft. He played college football at Mississippi Valley State.

Whitaker has also played for the Kansas City Chiefs, San Antonio Riders, Minnesota Vikings and Chicago Bears.

References

1964 births
Living people
Players of American football from Atlanta
American football tight ends
Mississippi Valley State Delta Devils football players
Kansas City Chiefs players
San Antonio Riders players
Minnesota Vikings players
Chicago Bears players